75 State Street is a high-rise office building located in the Financial District of Boston. Built in 1988, it was designed by Gund Architects of Boston, in association with Skidmore, Owings and Merrill, in the Postmodernist style.

The building is currently managed by Rockhill Management, L.L.C, an affiliate of the Rockpoint Group.

Tenants 
LPL Financial
Santander Bank
Amwell
Grant Thornton LLP
Hollister Staffing
L.E.K. Consulting
CDM Smith
Atlantic Global Risk LLC
White & Case LLP

References

External links 

 Entry on Emporis
 Entry on SkyscraperPage

Skyscraper office buildings in Boston
Office buildings completed in 1988

Skidmore, Owings & Merrill buildings